Events from the year 1997 in the Palestinian territories

Incumbents 
Palestinian National Authority (non-state administrative authority)
Yasser Arafat (Fatah), President,  5 July 1994 – 11 November 2004

Events 

 Protocol Concerning the Redeployment in Hebron

Establishments 

 The Al-Aqsa Islamic Bank was established.
 Kfar HaOranim was founded.
 Sansana was founded.

Sports 

 Markaz Shabab Al-Am'ari was in the 1997 Arab Club Champions Cup.

See also
1997 in Israel

References

 
Palestinian territories
Years of the 20th century in the Palestinian territories
1990s in the Palestinian territories
Palestinian territories